A Canadaphile (also called Canadophile, Canadiophile, Canadaphilic or Canadaphiliac) is a person who admires Canada, its people, culture, and languages (mainly English and French).

The word is derived from the country of Canada and Ancient Greek φίλος philos, "friend." Its antonym is Canadophobe.

See also
 Canadian nationalism
 Culture of Canada

References

Admiration of foreign cultures
Canadian culture
Canadian nationalism